Ankur Garg (born 6 April 1982), is an Indian film producer and entrepreneur who co-founded the production company Luv Films with his childhood friend Luv Ranjan in 2012. He is also the founder of iForIndia.org, a social organization.

Early life
Ankur Garg was born in Ghaziabad, Uttar Pradesh, where he received his education. He did his Bachelor of Engineering (Information Technology) from the University of Pune.

Career
Ankur worked with Microsoft for 7 years. In his last role at the company, he was the Lead – Customer & Partner Experience. He quit Microsoft in September 2012 to start a film production house, Luv Films with his childhood friend Luv Ranjan, where Garg handles the business reigns of the company.

In his role as a producer at Luv Films, he has produced the 2018 blockbuster Sonu Ke Titu Ki Sweety starring Kartik Aaryan, Nushrat Bharucha and Sunny Singh, De De Pyaar De (2019) starring Ajay Devgn, Tabu and Rakul Preet Singh, Jai Mummy Di (2020) starring Sunny Singh, Sonnalli Seygall, Supriya Pathak and Poonam Dhillon and Malang: Unleash The Madness (2020) starring Anil Kapoor, Aditya Roy Kapur, Disha Patani and Kunal Khemu. After the successful run of Malang, its sequel has also been announced. In 2020, he  produced Chhalaang, a social comedy directed by Hansal Mehta starring Rajkummar Rao and Nushrat Bharucha. He also produced the popular digital sitcom Life Sahi Hai.

Luv Films’ upcoming films includes the Luv Ranjan directorial Tu Jhoothi Main Makkaar starring Ranbir Kapoor and Shraddha Kapoor, Aasmaan Bharadwaj directorial Kuttey starring Arjun Kapoor, Tabu, Konkana Sen Sharma, Naseeruddin Shah & Radhika Madan is a co-production with Vishal Bharadwaj.

In August 2013, Garg launched a social organization iForIndia.org which focuses on building accountability in Indian politics.

Filmography

References

External links
 

1982 births
Living people
People from Ghaziabad, Uttar Pradesh
Savitribai Phule Pune University alumni
Microsoft employees
Indian social entrepreneurs
Film producers from Mumbai
Indian advertising people